Mateo Marić (born 18 March 1998) is a Bosnian professional footballer who plays as a defensive midfielder for 1. HNL club Lokomotiva and the Bosnia and Herzegovina U21 national team.

References

External links

1998 births
Living people
People from Grude
Bosnia and Herzegovina footballers
Premier League of Bosnia and Herzegovina players
Croatian Football League players
NK Široki Brijeg players
NK Lokomotiva Zagreb players
Bosnia and Herzegovina under-21 international footballers
Association football midfielders
Croats of Bosnia and Herzegovina